Suite en sous-sol is an EP by American post-punk band Tuxedomoon, released on July 28, 1982 by Expanded Music. The album was issued on CD in 1986 by Cramboy, bundled together with Time to Lose and Short Stories.

Track listing

Personnel 
Adapted from the Suite en sous-sol liner notes.

Tuxedomoon
 Steven Brown – clavinet, saxophone, keyboards, lead vocals (C1), piano (C2)
 Peter Dachert (as Peter Principle) – bass guitar, guitar, drum programming, percussion, effects
 Blaine L. Reininger – violin, clavinet, keyboards, bass guitar, lead vocals (A2)

Additional musicians
 Slugfinger Lipton – guitar (A2)
 Khessassi Mohammed – oud (B)
 Miri Mohammed – goblet drum (B)
 Winston Tong – lead vocals (D)
Production and additional personnel
 Gilles Martin – production
 Jean-François Octave – cover art, design
 Tuxedomoon – production

Release history

References

External links 
 Suite en sous-sol at Discogs (list of releases)

1982 EPs
Tuxedomoon albums